Gabriel Zahiu (born 17 November 1956) is a Romanian former footballer who played as a midfielder.

Honours
Steaua București
Divizia A: 1975–76, 1977–78
Cupa României: 1975–76, 1978–79, runner-up 1976–77, 1979–80
Gloria Buzău
Divizia B: 1983–84

References

1956 births
Living people
Romanian footballers
Association football midfielders
Liga I players
Liga II players
FC Gloria Buzău players
FC Steaua București players
Örebro SK players
Romanian expatriate footballers
Expatriate footballers in Sweden
Expatriate sportspeople in Sweden
Romanian expatriate sportspeople in Sweden
People from Buzău